Novogrigoryevskaya is a rural locality (a stanitsa) and the administrative center of Novogrigoryevskoye Rural Settlement, Ilovlinsky District, Volgograd Oblast, Russia. The population was 736 as of 2010. There are 20 streets.

Geography 
Novogrigoryevskaya is located in steppe, on the right bank of the Don River, 40 km northwest of Ilovlya (the district's administrative centre) by road. Viltov is the nearest rural locality.

References 

Rural localities in Ilovlinsky District
Don Host Oblast